This is a list of electoral division results for the Australian 1958 federal election.

Overall
This section is an excerpt from 1958 Australian federal election § House of Representatives

New South Wales

Banks 
This section is an excerpt from Electoral results for the Division of Banks § 1958

Barton 
This section is an excerpt from Electoral results for the Division of Barton § 1958

Bennelong 
This section is an excerpt from Electoral results for the Division of Bennelong § 1958

Blaxland 
This section is an excerpt from Electoral results for the Division of Blaxland § 1958

Bradfield 
This section is an excerpt from Electoral results for the Division of Bradfield § 1958

Calare 
This section is an excerpt from Electoral results for the Division of Calare § 1958

Cowper 
This section is an excerpt from Electoral results for the Division of Cowper § 1958

Cunningham 
This section is an excerpt from Electoral results for the Division of Cunningham § 1958

Dalley 
This section is an excerpt from Electoral results for the Division of Dalley § 1958

Darling 
This section is an excerpt from Electoral results for the Division of Darling § 1958

East Sydney 
This section is an excerpt from Electoral results for the Division of East Sydney § 1958

Eden-Monaro 
This section is an excerpt from Electoral results for the Division of Eden-Monaro § 1958

Evans 
This section is an excerpt from Electoral results for the Division of Evans § 1958

Farrer 
This section is an excerpt from Electoral results for the Division of Farrer § 1958

Grayndler 
This section is an excerpt from Electoral results for the Division of Grayndler § 1958

Gwydir 
This section is an excerpt from Electoral results for the Division of Gwydir § 1958

Hughes 
This section is an excerpt from Electoral results for the Division of Hughes § 1958

Hume 
This section is an excerpt from Electoral results for the Division of Hume § 1958

Hunter 
This section is an excerpt from Electoral results for the Division of Hunter § 1958

Kingsford Smith 
This section is an excerpt from Electoral results for the Division of Kingsford Smith § 1958

Lang 
This section is an excerpt from Electoral results for the Division of Lang § 1958

Lawson 
This section is an excerpt from Electoral results for the Division of Lawson § 1958

Lowe 
This section is an excerpt from Electoral results for the Division of Lowe § 1958

Lyne 
This section is an excerpt from Electoral results for the Division of Lyne § 1958

Macarthur 
This section is an excerpt from Electoral results for the Division of Macarthur § 1958

Mackellar 
This section is an excerpt from Electoral results for the Division of Mackellar § 1958

Macquarie 
This section is an excerpt from Electoral results for the Division of Macquarie § 1958

Mitchell 
This section is an excerpt from Electoral results for the Division of Mitchell § 1958

New England 
This section is an excerpt from Electoral results for the Division of New England § 1958

Newcastle 
This section is an excerpt from Electoral results for the Division of Newcastle1958

North Sydney 
This section is an excerpt from Electoral results for the Division of North Sydney § 1958

Parkes 
This section is an excerpt from Electoral results for the Division of Parkes (1901–1969) § 1958

Parramatta 
This section is an excerpt from Electoral results for the Division of Parramatta § 1958

Paterson 
This section is an excerpt from Electoral results for the Division of Paterson § 1958

Phillip 
This section is an excerpt from Electoral results for the Division of Phillip § 1958

Reid
This section is an excerpt from Electoral results for the Division of Reid § 1958

Richmond 
This section is an excerpt from Electoral results for the Division of Richmond § 1958

Riverina 
This section is an excerpt from Electoral results for the Division of Riverina § 1958

Robertson 
This section is an excerpt from Electoral results for the Division of Robertson § 1958

Shortland 
This section is an excerpt from Electoral results for the Division of Shortland § 1958

St George 
This section is an excerpt from Electoral results for the Division of St George § 1958

Warringah 
This section is an excerpt from Electoral results for the Division of Warringah § 1958

Watson 
This section is an excerpt from Electoral results for the Division of Watson (1934–1969) § 1958

Wentworth 
This section is an excerpt from Electoral results for the Division of Wentworth § 1958

Werriwa 
This section is an excerpt from Electoral results for the Division of Werriwa § 1958

West Sydney 
This section is an excerpt from Electoral results for the Division of West Sydney § 1958

Victoria

Balaclava 
This section is an excerpt from Electoral results for the Division of Balaclava § 1958

Ballaarat 
This section is an excerpt from Electoral results for the Division of Ballarat § 1958

Batman 
This section is an excerpt from Electoral results for the Division of Batman § 1958

Bendigo 
This section is an excerpt from Electoral results for the Division of Bendigo § 1958

Bruce 
This section is an excerpt from Electoral results for the Division of Bruce § 1958

Chisholm 
This section is an excerpt from Electoral results for the Division of Chisholm § 1958

Corangamite 
This section is an excerpt from Electoral results for the Division of Corangamite § 1958

Corio 
This section is an excerpt from Electoral results for the Division of Corio § 1958

Darebin 
This section is an excerpt from Electoral results for the Division of Darebin § 1958

Deakin 
This section is an excerpt from Electoral results for the Division of Deakin § 1958

Fawkner 
This section is an excerpt from Electoral results for the Division of Fawkner § 1958

Flinders 
This section is an excerpt from Electoral results for the Division of Flinders § 1958

Gellibrand 
This section is an excerpt from Electoral results for the Division of Gellibrand § 1958

Gippsland 
This section is an excerpt from Electoral results for the Division of Gippsland § 1958

Henty 
This section is an excerpt from Electoral results for the Division of Henty § 1958

Higgins 
This section is an excerpt from Electoral results for the Division of Higgins § 1958

Higinbotham 
This section is an excerpt from Electoral results for the Division of Higinbotham § 1958

Indi 
This section is an excerpt from Electoral results for the Division of Indi § 1958

Isaacs 
This section is an excerpt from Electoral results for the Division of Isaacs (1949–1969) § 1958

Kooyong 
This section is an excerpt from Electoral results for the Division of Kooyong § 1958

La Trobe 
This section is an excerpt from Electoral results for the Division of La Trobe § 1958

Lalor 
This section is an excerpt from Electoral results for the Division of Lalor § 1958

Mallee 
This section is an excerpt from Electoral results for the Division of Mallee § 1958

Maribyrnong 
This section is an excerpt from Electoral results for the Division of Maribyrnong § 1958

McMillan 
This section is an excerpt from Electoral results for the Division of McMillan § 1958

Melbourne 
This section is an excerpt from Electoral results for the Division of Melbourne § 1958

Melbourne Ports 
This section is an excerpt from Electoral results for the Division of Melbourne Ports § 1958

Murray 
This section is an excerpt from Electoral results for the Division of Murray § 1958

Scullin 
This section is an excerpt from Electoral results for the Division of Scullin (1955–69) § 1958

Wannon 
This section is an excerpt from Electoral results for the Division of Wannon § 1958

Wills 
This section is an excerpt from Electoral results for the Division of Wills § 1958

Wimmera 
This section is an excerpt from Electoral results for the Division of Wimmera § 1958

Yarra 
This section is an excerpt from Electoral results for the Division of Yarra § 1958

Queensland

Bowman 
This section is an excerpt from Electoral results for the Division of Bowman § 1958

Brisbane 
This section is an excerpt from Electoral results for the Division of Brisbane § 1958

Capricornia 
This section is an excerpt from Electoral results for the Division of Capricornia § 1958

Darling Downs 
This section is an excerpt from Electoral results for the Division of Darling Downs § 1958

Dawson 
This section is an excerpt from Electoral results for the Division of Dawson § 1958

Fisher 
This section is an excerpt from Electoral results for the Division of Fisher § 1958

Griffith 
This section is an excerpt from Electoral results for the Division of Griffith § 1958

Herbert 
This section is an excerpt from Electoral results for the Division of Herbert § 1958

Kennedy 
This section is an excerpt from Electoral results for the Division of Kennedy § 1958

Leichhardt 
This section is an excerpt from Electoral results for the Division of Leichhardt § 1958

Lilley 
This section is an excerpt from Electoral results for the Division of Lilley § 1958

Maranoa 
This section is an excerpt from Electoral results for the Division of Maranoa § 1958

McPherson 
This section is an excerpt from Electoral results for the Division of McPherson § 1958

Moreton 
This section is an excerpt from Electoral results for the Division of Moreton § 1958

Oxley 
This section is an excerpt from Electoral results for the Division of Oxley § 1958

Petrie 
This section is an excerpt from Electoral results for the Division of Petrie § 1958

Ryan 
This section is an excerpt from Electoral results for the Division of Ryan § 1958

Wide Bay 
This section is an excerpt from Electoral results for the Division of Wide Bay § 1958

South Australia

Adelaide 
This section is an excerpt from Electoral results for the Division of Adelaide § 1958

Angas 
This section is an excerpt from Electoral results for the Division of Angas (1949–1977) § 1949

Barker 
This section is an excerpt from Electoral results for the Division of Barker § 1958

Bonython 
This section is an excerpt from Electoral results for the Division of Bonython § 1958

Boothby 
This section is an excerpt from Electoral results for the Division of Boothby § 1958

Grey 
This section is an excerpt from Electoral results for the Division of Grey § 1958

Hindmarsh 
This section is an excerpt from Electoral results for the Division of Hindmarsh § 1958

Kingston 
This section is an excerpt from Electoral results for the Division of Kingston § 1958

Port Adelaide 
This section is an excerpt from Electoral results for the Division of Port Adelaide § 1958

Sturt 
This section is an excerpt from Electoral results for the Division of Sturt § 1958

Wakefield 
This section is an excerpt from Electoral results for the Division of Wakefield § 1958

Western Australia

Canning 
This section is an excerpt from Electoral results for the Division of Canning § 1958

Curtin 
This section is an excerpt from Electoral results for the Division of Curtin § 1958

Forrest 
This section is an excerpt from Electoral results for the Division of Forrest § 1958

Fremantle 
This section is an excerpt from Electoral results for the Division of Fremantle § 1958

Kalgoorlie 
This section is an excerpt from Electoral results for the Division of Kalgoorlie § 1958

Moore 
This section is an excerpt from Electoral results for the Division of Moore § 1958

Perth 
This section is an excerpt from Electoral results for the Division of Perth § 1958

Stirling 
This section is an excerpt from Electoral results for the Division of Stirling § 1958

Swan 
This section is an excerpt from Electoral results for the Division of Swan § 1958

Tasmania

Bass 
This section is an excerpt from Electoral results for the Division of Bass § 1958

Braddon 
This section is an excerpt from Electoral results for the Division of Braddon § 1958

Denison 
This section is an excerpt from Electoral results for the Division of Denison § 1958

Franklin 
This section is an excerpt from Electoral results for the Division of Franklin § 1958

Wilmot 
This section is an excerpt from Electoral results for the Division of Wilmot § 1958

Territories

Australian Capital Territory 
This section is an excerpt from Electoral results for the Division of Australian Capital Territory § 1958

Northern Territory 
This section is an excerpt from Electoral results for the Division of Northern Territory § 1958

See also 

 Candidates of the 1958 Australian federal election
 Members of the Australian House of Representatives, 1958–1961

References 

House of Representatives 1958